Relaxer is a 2018 American comedy film written and directed by Joel Potrykus. It stars Joshua Burge, David Dastmalchian, Andre Hyland, Amari Cheatom, and Adina Howard. Set in 1999, it tells the story of a man playing Pac-Man in a living room. The film premiered at the South by Southwest on March 9, 2018. At the 2018 Fantasia International Film Festival, Joshua Burge won the Best Actor award for his work in the film. It was released in the United States on March 22, 2019.

Plot
In 1999, Cam (David Dastmalchian) gives his younger brother Abbie (Joshua Burge) an ultimate challenge. Abbie is not allowed to leave the couch until he goes beyond the level 256 of Pac-Man.

Cast
 Joshua Burge as Abbie
 David Dastmalchian as Cam
 Andre Hyland as Dallas
 Amari Cheatom as Cortez
 Adina Howard as Arin

Production
The film was shot in the garage of a house owned by production designer Mike Saunders' parents. It took four months to build the set. The film's premise was inspired by Luis Buñuel's The Exterminating Angel.

Release
The film had its premiere at the South by Southwest on March 9, 2018. It was also screened at the Fantasia International Film Festival, the Traverse City Film Festival, and the Vancouver International Film Festival. It was released in the United States on March 22, 2019.

Reception
The website's critical consensus reads, "Relaxer is bound to strike many viewers as unpleasant, but this thoroughly unique comedy will strike a chord with fans of defiantly unsettling cinema." At Metacritic, the film has a weighted average score of 82 out of 100, based on 7 critics, indicating "universal acclaim".

Eric Kohn of IndieWire gave the film a grade of A, describing it as "a grotesque downward spiral, both hilarious and mesmerizing, but above all elevated by its insights into the depraved final gasp of the analog age." Calum Marsh of The Village Voice stated that the film is "funnier, nastier, and more abrasive" than Joel Potrykus' 2014 film Buzzard. Nick Allen of RogerEbert.com said, "through its precise filmmaking and whirlwind script about one loser who never gets off the couch, it's a magnetic, five-senses experience for slacker cinema." John DeFore of The Hollywood Reporter said, "the claustrophobic, one-set film clearly invites metaphorical readings — but its allegories will play best to viewers who can stomach the idea of spending eternity on a couch playing Nintendo." Carson Lund of Slant Magazine gave the film 3.5 stars out of 4, calling it "a showcase for [Joshua] Burge and his exceptional features, from his beady eyes to slender frame."

Joshua Burge won the Best Actor award at the 2018 Fantasia International Film Festival.

References

External links
 
 

2018 films
American comedy films
Films directed by Joel Potrykus
Films set in 1999
Films set in Michigan
Films shot in Michigan
Magic realism films
2010s English-language films
2010s American films